= Building of the Alexander Podvorie (Moscow) =

- Здание Александровского подворья
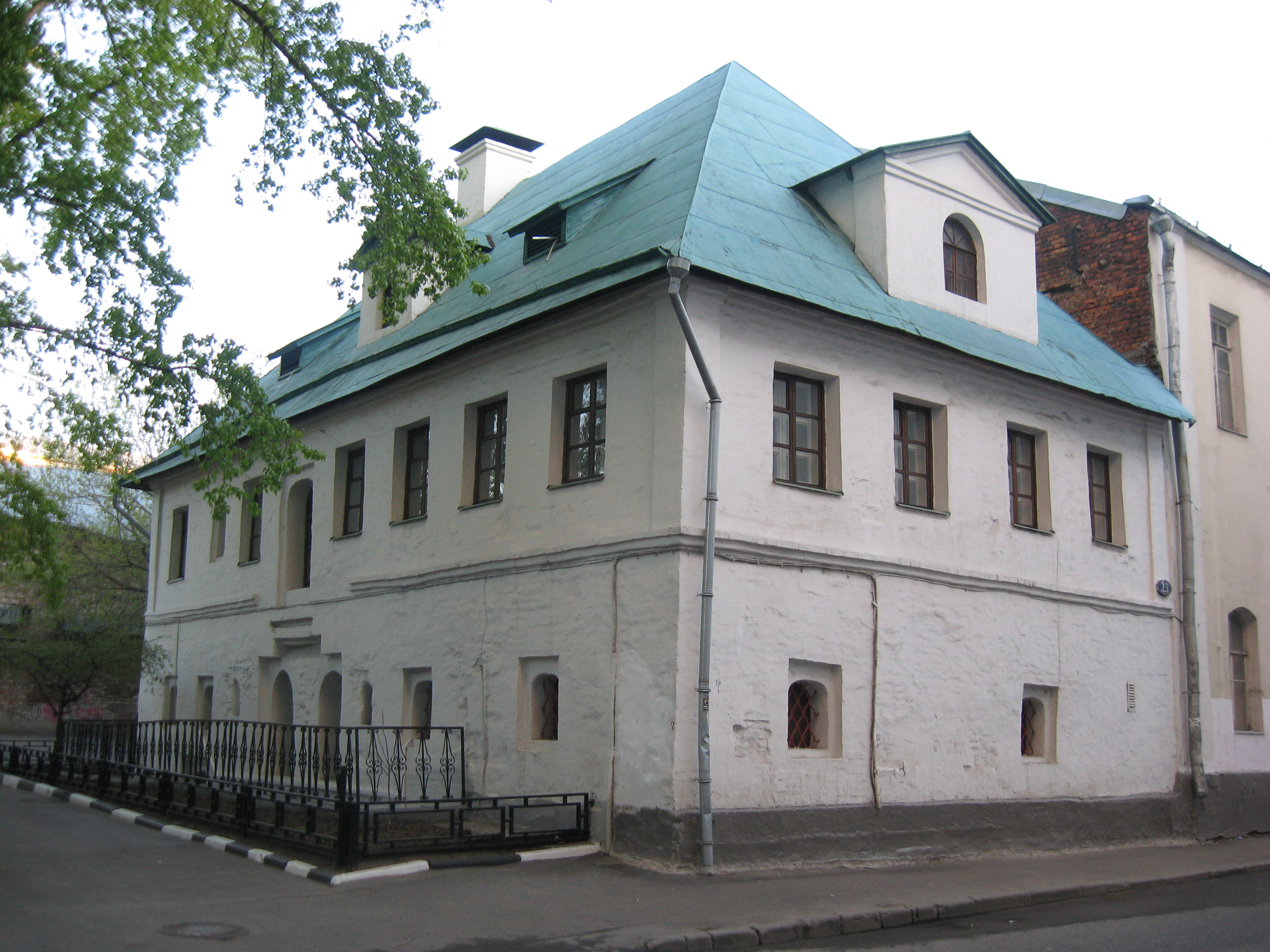
- Location: Moscow, Starovagankovsky Pereulok, 23
- Coordinates: 55.7519°N 37.6075°E
- Opening date: 17th century

The building of the Alexander Podvorie (Russian: Здание Александровского подворья) is a masonry built in the end of the 17th century in Moscow The building was built in the backyard of the Assumption Monastery of Alexandrov Sloboda and the Florischevoy Desert. It is located in the center of the city (Starovagankovsky Lane, 23) and has the status of an object of cultural heritage of federal significance.

== History ==
The Chambers at Starovagankovsky Lane were built in the late 17th century. Since 1679, they housed the farmsteads of the Assumption Monastery of Alexandrov Sloboda and the Florischevaya Desert. The premises were rented out. In the 1890s, Moscow historian Alexei Alexandrovich Martynov lived in the building. In 1978, restoration work was carried out by I. I. Kazakevich and V. V. Putyatin. Currently, the building houses offices.

== Architecture ==
The two-story building is constructed of stone. It includes two different rooms, separated by a corridor, which is typical for residential buildings of that time. The original vaulted ceilings were preserved on the ground floor and in the basement. The front entrance is located on the south side, from the courtyard. The porch is not preserved; its existence now resembles a doorway on the second floor, where an external staircase originally led. After the restoration in the 1970s, profiled interstitial towers and cornices, platbands, lattices on windows, as well as a high four-pitched roof with attic projections were restored.
